Goodenia fascicularis, commonly known as silky goodenia, is a species of flowering plant in the family Goodeniaceae and is widely distributed in eastern continental Australia. It is an ascending perennial herb with linear to egg-shaped leaves and racemes of yellow flowers.

Description
Flowering occurs in most months and the fruit is a more or less spherical capsule  in diameter.

Taxonomy and naming
Goodenia fascicularis was first formally described in 1890 by Ferdinand von Mueller and Ralph Tate in the Transactions, proceedings and report, Royal Society of South Australia from material collected in the Basedow Range (near Imanpa) in the Northern Territory, during the Tietkens expedition to Central Australia. The specific epithet (fascicularis) means "belonging to a small bundle".

Distribution and habitat
This goodenia grows in a wide range of habitats including scrub, woodland and grassland west of Tamworth in New South Wales, in northern and north-western Victoria, and in Queensland, the Northern Territory and South Australia.

References

fascicularis
Flora of the Northern Territory
Flora of South Australia
Flora of Queensland
Flora of New South Wales
Flora of Victoria (Australia)
Plants described in 1890
Taxa named by Ferdinand von Mueller
Taxa named by Ralph Tate
Endemic flora of Australia